Battle of Maarat al-Numan may refer to:

 Siege of Ma'arra, during the First Crusade
 Battle of Maarat al-Numan (2012), during the Syrian civil war
 Battle of Maarat al-Numan (2016), during the Syrian civil war